Drugs Are Nice: A Post-Punk Memoir is the memoir of Lisa Crystal Carver published by Soft Skull Press in the US in 2005 and by Snowbooks in the UK in 2006, detailing her early childhood and later romantic relationships with Costes, Boyd Rice and Smog's Bill Callahan.

2005 non-fiction books
American memoirs
Soft Skull Press books

he:קטגוריה:ספרות יהודית